Sugathakumari (22 January 1934 – 23 December 2020) was an Indian poet and activist, who was at the forefront of environmental and feminist movements in Kerala, South India. Her parents were the poet and freedom fighter Bodheswaran and V. K. Karthiyayini Amma, a Sanskrit scholar.
She was the founder secretary of the Prakrithi Samrakshana Samithi, an organisation for the protection of nature, and of Abhaya, a home for destitute women and a day-care centre for the mentally ill. She chaired the Kerala State Women's Commission. She played a prominent role in the Save Silent Valley protest.

Sugathakumari's notable works included Muthuchippikal, Pathirapookkal, Krishna Kavithakal, Ratrimazha, and Manalezhuthu. She won numerous awards and recognitions including Kerala Sahitya Akademi Award (1968), Kendra Sahitya Akademi Award (1978), Odakkuzhal Award (1982), Vayalar Award (1984), Indira Priyadarshini Vriksha Mitra Award (1986), Asan Prize (1991), Vallathol Award (2003), Kerala Sahitya Akademi Fellowship (2004), Ezhuthachan Puraskaram (2009), Saraswati Samman (2012), Mathrubhumi Literary Award (2014) and O. N. V. Literary Award (2017). In 2006, she was honoured with Padma Shri, the country's fourth-highest civilian honour.

Early life

Sugathakumari was born in Aranmula on 22 January 1934 in the modern day southern Indian state of Kerala (then in the Kingdom of Travancore). Her father Keshava Pillai, known as Bodheswaran, was a famous Gandhian thinker and writer, who was involved in the country's freedom struggle.  V. K. Karthiyayini Amma, her mother, was a well-known scholar and teacher of Sanskrit. Sugathakumari was the second of the three daughters of her parents, following an elder sister named Hrdayakumari, and preceding a younger sister named Sujatha Devi, both of them who excelled in literary field. After graduating from the University College, Thiruvananthapuram, Sugathakumari completed her master's degree in philosophy from Government College for Women, Thiruvananthapuram in 1955, and spent three years researching on the topic of 'Comparative Study of the Concept of Moksha in Indian Schools of Philosophy' but did not complete the thesis. Sugathakumari was the former state vice president of Kerala Students Union (KSU). She worked at KSU for 3 years, from 1959-1962.

Literary career

Sugathakumari's first poem, which she published under a pseudonym in a weekly journal in 1957, attracted wide attention. In 1968, Sugathakumari won the Kerala Sahitya Akademi Award for Poetry for her work Pathirappookal (Flowers of Midnight). Raathrimazha (Night Rain) won the Kendra Sahitya Academy Award in 1978. Her other collections include Paavam Manavahridayam, Muthuchippi, Manalezhuth, Irulchirakukal and Swapnabhoomi. Sugathakumari's earlier poetry mostly dealt with the tragic quest for love and is considered more lyrical than her later works, in which the quiet, lyrical sensibility is replaced by increasingly feminist responses to social disorder and injustice. Environmental issues and other contemporary problems are also sharply portrayed in her poetry.

Sugathakumari has been described as among the most sensitive and most philosophical of contemporary Malayalam poets. Her poetry drew on her sadness. In an interview, she said, "I have been inspired to write mostly through my emotional upheavals; few of my poems can be called joyous. But these days I feel I'm slowly walking away from it all, to a world that is futile or meaningless". Sugathakumari's most famous works include Raathrimazha, Ambalamani (temple bell) and Manalezhuthu. Sugathakumari also wrote children's literature, receiving an Award for Lifetime Contribution to Children's Literature, instituted by the State Institute of Children's Literature, in 2008. She also translated many pieces of work into Malayalam.

She won numerous other awards for her literary works, including the Vayalar Award and Ezhuthachan Puraskaram, the highest literary honour from the Government of Kerala. In 2004, she was given the Kerala Sahitya Akademi Fellowship. She won the Saraswati Samman in 2012, being only the third Malayalam writer to do so. She also won the Pandit Karuppan Award. She was the principal of Kerala State Jawahar Balabhavan, Thiruvananthapuram. She was the founding chief editor of 'Thaliru', a children's magazine published by Kerala State Institute of Children's Literature.

Social activism

A committed conservationist, Sugathakumari served as the secretary of the Society for Conservation of Nature, Thiruvananthapuram. In the late 1970s she led a successful nationwide movement, known as Save Silent Valley, to save some of the oldest natural forests in the country, the Silent Valley in Kerala, from submersion as a result of a planned hydroelectric project. Her poem Marathinu Stuthi (Ode to a Tree) became a symbol for the protest from the intellectual community and was the opening song of most of the Save Silent Valley campaign meetings. She was the founding secretary of the Prakrithi Samrakshana Samithi, an organisation for the protection of nature. She was also actively involved with various women's movements of the 1970s and served as the chair of the Kerala State Women's Commission.

Sugathakumari also founded Abhaya (refuge), an organisation that provides shelter to female mental patients, after being appalled at conditions in the government-run mental hospital in Thiruvananthapuram. Three women led by social activist and artist G. Geetha, demanded a probe into the rape of a Dalit inmate woman by two counselors and the hostel warden of 'Abhaya' in 2002.

Sugathakumari received the Bhattia Award for Social Science, the Sacred Soul International Award, the Lakshmi Award for social service, and the first Indira Priyadarshini Vriksha Mitra Award from the Government of India for her efforts in environmental conservation and afforestation.

Personal life 
Sugathakumari's husband Dr. K. Velayudhan Nair (died 2003) was an educationist and writer who was an expert in educational psychology. They had a daughter, Lekshmi Devi. Sugathakumari's elder sister Hridayakumari was a literary critic, orator and educationist. The Kerala government declared Sugathakumari's ancestral house, Vazhuvelil Tharavadu, as a protected monument on her 84th birthday.

Sugathakumari died on 23 December 2020, due to complications from COVID-19 during the COVID-19 pandemic in India, at the Government Medical College, Thiruvananthapuram, thirty days short from her 87th birthday. She was cremated with full state honours at Santhikavadam crematorium in Thiruvananthapuram on the same day.

Works

Mutthuchippi (Pearl and Oyster; 1961)
Pathirappookkal (Midnight Flowers; 1967)
Paavam Pavam Manava Hrudayam (Poor Human Heart; 1968)
Pranamam (Salutation; 1969)
Irul Chirakukal (The Wings of Darkness; 1969)
Raathrimazha (Night Rain; 1977)
Ambalamani (Temple Bell; 1981)
Kurinjippookkal (Kurinji Flowers; 1987) Pavada was also one of her works
Thulaavarshappacha (The Monsoon Green; 1990)
Radhayevide (Where is Radha?; 1995)
Devadasi (1998)
Manalezhuthu (The Writing on the Sand; 2006)
Abhisarika
Sugathakumariyude Kavithakal (2006)
Krishnakavithakal (2008)
Megham Vannu Thottappol (2010)
Poovazhi Maruvazhi
Kaadinu Kaaval

Awards and recognitions

Civilian honours
 2006: Padma Shri

Literary awards

 1968: Kerala Sahitya Akademi Award for Poetry for Pathirappookkal
 1978: Kendra Sahitya Akademi Award for Rathrimazha
 1982: Odakkuzhal Award for Ambalamani
 1984: Vayalar Award for Ambalamani
 1990: Asan Prize
 2001: Lalithambika Sahitya Award
 2003: Vallathol Award
 2004: Kerala Sahitya Akademi Fellowship
 2004: Balamaniamma Award
    
 2006: Deviprasadam Trust Award                                                                   
 2007: P. Kunhiraman Nair Award for Manalezhuthu
 2008: Mahakavi Pandalam Keralavarma Poetry Award
 2008: Award for Lifetime Contribution to Children's Literature
 2009: Ezhuthachan Award
 2009: Basheer Puraskaram
 2012: Saraswati Samman for Manalezhuthu
 2013: PKV Award for Literature
 2013: Pandit Karuppan Award
 2014: VT Literary Award
 2014: Mathrubhumi Literary Award
 2014: Thoppil Bhasi Award
 2017: O. N. V. Literary Award
 2017: P. Kesavadev Literary Award
 2019: Kadammanitta Ramakrishnan Award

Other awards
 1986: Indira Priyadarshini Vriksha Mitra Award
 2006: Panampilly Prathibha Puraskaram
 2007: Streesakti Award
 2007: K. Kunhirama Kurup Award
 2009: M.T.Chandrasenan Award

References

Further reading

External links
 
 
 
 Meet the author – Sahitya Akademi
 Leading Lights – Smt. Sugathakumari
 Sugathakumari excerpts from an Interview 

1934 births
2020 deaths
Deaths from pneumonia in India
Novelists from Kerala
Indian women novelists
Malayalam-language writers
Malayalam poets
Activists from Kerala
Indian women activists
Indian women's rights activists
Indian conservationists
Indian human rights activists
Recipients of the Padma Shri in literature & education
University College Thiruvananthapuram alumni
Recipients of the Sahitya Akademi Award in Malayalam
Recipients of the Ezhuthachan Award
Recipients of the Kerala Sahitya Akademi Award
Indian women poets
Indian women children's writers
Indian children's writers
People from Aranmula
20th-century Indian poets
21st-century Indian poets
20th-century Indian novelists
21st-century Indian novelists
20th-century Indian women writers
21st-century Indian women writers
21st-century Indian writers
Women writers from Kerala
Indian women environmentalists
Poets from Kerala
Deaths from the COVID-19 pandemic in India